Tritonia gracilis is a species of dendronotid nudibranch. It is a shell-less marine gastropod mollusc in the family Tritoniidae.

References

Tritoniidae
Gastropods described in 1818